Essequibo is the largest traditional region of Guyana but not an administrative region of Guyana today. It may also refer to:

 Essequibo River, the largest river in Guyana
 Essequibo (colony), a former Dutch colony in what is now Guyana;
 Essequibo Islands-West Demerara, an administrative region of Guyana today
 Guayana Esequiba, also called Essequibo, Spanish name of a region administered and controlled by Guyana and regarded as part of its territory but also claimed by Venezuela
 Essequibo cricket team, a former first-class cricket team in Guyana